Finland participated in the Eurovision Song Contest 2022 in Turin, Italy, with the song "Jezebel" written by Lauri Ylönen and Desmond Child, and performed by The Rasmus. The Finnish broadcaster  (Yle) organised the national final  2022 in order to select the Finnish entry for the contest. Seven entries were selected to compete in the national final on 26 February 2022, where the combination of votes from seven international jury groups and votes from the public selected the winner.

Finland was drawn to compete in the second semi-final of the Eurovision Song Contest which took place on 12 May 2022. Performing during the show in position 1, "Jezebel" was announced among the top 10 entries of the second semi-final and hence qualified to compete in the final. In the final, Finland placed 21st with 38 points. It was later revealed that the country placed 7th in the semi-final with 162 points.

Background 

Prior to the 2022 contest, Finland has participated in the Eurovision Song Contest fifty-four times since its first entry in 1961.

The Finnish national broadcaster,  (Yle), broadcasts the event within Finland and organises the selection process for the nation's entry. Yle confirmed their intentions to participate at the 2022 Eurovision Song Contest on 24 May 2021. Finland's entries for the Eurovision Song Contest have been selected through national final competitions that have varied in format over the years. Between 1961 and 2011, a selection show that was often titled  highlighted that the purpose of the program was to select a song for Eurovision. However, since 2012, the broadcaster has organised the selection show  (UMK), which focuses on showcasing new music with the winning song being selected as the Finnish Contest entry for that year. Along with their participation confirmation, the broadcaster also announced that the Finnish entry for the 2022 contest would be selected through  2022.

Before Eurovision

Uuden Musiikin Kilpailu 2022 

Competing entries 
A submission period was opened by Yle which lasted between 1 September 2021 and 6 September 2021. At least one of the writers and the lead singer(s) had to hold Finnish citizenship or live in Finland permanently in order for the entry to qualify to compete. A panel of eight experts appointed by Yle selected seven entries for the competition from the 312 received submissions. The experts were Tapio Hakanen (Head of Music at YleX), Anssi Autio (UMK producer), Juha-Matti Valtonen (television director), Samuli Väänänen (Senior Editor at Spotify Finland), Joanna Tzortzis (music editor), Katri Norrlin (music journalist at YleX), Jani Kareinen (music journalist at YleX) and Amie Borgar (Head of Music at ). The competing entries were presented on 13 January 2022, while their lyric videos were released between 13 and 21 January 2022.

Final 
The final took place on 26 February 2022 where seven entries competed. "Jezebel" performed by The Rasmus was selected as the winner by a combination of public votes (75%) and seven international jury groups from Cyprus, Norway, Serbia, Germany, Spain, the Czech Republic and Italy (25%). The viewers had a total of 882 points to award, while the juries had a total of 294 points to award. Each jury group distributed their points as follows: 2, 4, 6, 8, 10 and 12 points. The viewer vote was based on the percentage of votes each song achieved through the following voting methods: telephone, SMS and app voting. For example, if a song gained 10% of the viewer vote, then that entry would be awarded 10% of 882 points rounded to the nearest integer: 88 points. A total of 152,402 votes were cast during the show: 48,546 votes through telephone and SMS and 103,826 votes through the Yle app.

In addition to the performances of the competing entries, the show was opened by  Blind Channel performing "Dark Side" and "Bad Idea", while the interval act featured JVG performing their song "Vamos" and Paula Vesala performing her songs "Pulkka" and "Uu Mama".

At Eurovision 
According to Eurovision rules, all nations with the exceptions of the host country and the "Big Five" (France, Germany, Italy, Spain and the United Kingdom) are required to qualify from one of two semi-finals in order to compete for the final; the top ten countries from each semi-final progress to the final. The European Broadcasting Union (EBU) split up the competing countries into six different pots based on voting patterns from previous contests, with countries with favourable voting histories put into the same pot. On 25 January 2022, an allocation draw was held which placed each country into one of the two semi-finals, as well as which half of the show they would perform in. Finland has been placed into the second semi-final, to be held on 12 May 2022, and has been scheduled to perform in the first half of the show.

Once all the competing songs for the 2022 contest had been released, the running order for the semi-finals was decided by the shows' producers rather than through another draw, so that similar songs were not placed next to each other.

Voting
Voting during the three shows involved each country awarding two sets of points from 1-8, 10 and 12: one from their professional jury and the other from televoting. Each nation's jury consisted of five music industry professionals who are citizens of the country they represent, with a diversity in gender and age represented. The judges assess each entry based on the performances during the second dress rehearsal of each show, which takes place the night before each live show, against a set of criteria including: vocal capacity; the stage performance; the song's composition and originality; and the overall impression by the act. Jury members may only take part in panel once every three years, and are obliged to confirm that they are not connected to any of the participating acts in a way that would impact their ability to vote impartially. Jury members should also vote independently, with no discussion of their vote permitted with other jury members. The exact composition of the professional jury, and the results of each country's jury and televoting were released after the grand final; the individual results from each jury member were also released in an anonymised form.

Below is a breakdown of points awarded to Finland and awarded by Finland in the second semi-final and grand final of the contest, and the breakdown of the jury voting and televoting conducted during the two shows:

Points awarded to Finland

Points awarded by Finland

Detailed voting results
The following members comprised the Finnish jury:
 Amie Borgar
 Haza Hajipoori
 Juuso Määttänen
 Riku
 Tiina Susanna Vainikainen

References

External links 

 Official Yle Eurovision site
 Official Uuden Musiikin Kilpailu site

Countries in the Eurovision Song Contest 2022
2022
Eurovision Song Contest
Eurovision Song Contest